German submarine U-671 was a Type VIIC U-boat of Nazi Germany's Kriegsmarine during World War II. The submarine was laid down on 2 December 1941 at the Howaldtswerke yard at Hamburg, launched on 15 December 1942, and commissioned on 3 March 1943 under the command of Oberleutnant zur See August-Wilhelm hewicker.

Attached to 5th U-boat Flotilla based at Kiel, U-671 completed her training period on 30 April 1944 and was assigned to front-line service.

Design
German Type VIIC submarines were preceded by the shorter Type VIIB submarines. U-671 had a displacement of  when at the surface and  while submerged. She had two shafts and two  propellers.

U-671 was fitted with five  torpedo tubes (four fitted at the bow and one at the stern), fourteen torpedoes, one  SK C/35 naval gun, 220 rounds, and two twin  C/30 anti-aircraft guns. The boat had a complement of between forty-four and sixty.

Service history

On the second and last war patrol, U-671 was detected by two British warships in the English Channel south of Brighton in the early hours of 4 August 1944.  attacked with depth charges and hedgehogs causing severe damage to the U-boat. Repeated attacks resulted in an oil spill and a number of survivors appeared at the surface. Of the crew of 52 all but five perished in the attack.

References

Bibliography

External links

German Type VIIC submarines
1942 ships
Ships built in Hamburg
U-boats commissioned in 1943
U-boats sunk in 1943
World War II shipwrecks in the English Channel
U-boats sunk by British warships
U-boats sunk by depth charges
World War II submarines of Germany
Maritime incidents in August 1944